George Henry Preble (February 25, 1816 – March 1, 1885) was an American naval officer and writer, notable for his history of the flag of the United States and for taking the first photograph of the Fort McHenry flag that inspired the U.S. national anthem, "The Star-Spangled Banner".

Early life and education
He was born in Portland, Maine, into a seafaring family; his father was sea captain Enoch Preble, whose brother was the noted Commodore Edward Preble. George entered the Navy as a midshipman on December 10, 1835, serving on the frigate  until 1838.

Career
He was in the Florida war in 1841, and was on the sloop  for its circumnavigation of the world in 1843–1845, taking ashore the first American force to land in China. In the Mexican–American War, he participated in the capture of Alvarado, Veracruz, and Tuxpan. He became master on July 15, 1847, and lieutenant on February 5, 1848. While serving on the frigate , he went with Matthew C. Perry to Japan in 1853, during which Preble surveyed various harbors in the Far East.

When the Confederate cruiser  eluded him, Preble was dismissed from the Navy, but was reinstated after the captain of Florida testified that superior speed alone had saved him.

Additionally, each of the officers on Oneida testified that Preble had done no wrong. According to their accounts, Florida appeared at around 5:00 pm on September 4, 1862, bearing the ensign of a ship of the English Navy. Because the other ships were in for repairs, the usual complement of six ships had been reduced to two. Winona had been dispatched to chase another blockade runner and was returning from that chase when Florida began her run. One of Oneidas iron boilers had been shut down for repairs, leaving only one in operation. (One of the officers stated that the Navy's choice to use cheaper iron rather than steel was the actual cause of the problem.) 
When Florida began her run, Preble moved to placeOneida in front of Florida. At 6:00 pm, he ordered shots fired across her bow. Believing that the ship was English, two warning shots were fired over her bow and a third shot into her forefoot (The part of a ship at which the prow joins the keel) instead of the customary single warning shot. All three shots were fired within three minutes of her being in range of Oneidas guns. When Florida did not stop, Preble ordered the fourth shot be sent into the enemy ship. This shot missed, at which time Florida lowered her false ensign, and made directly for Fort Morgan. It was not until this point that Preble could be sure that the ship was a Confederate vessel. With one boiler out of commission, Oneida was unable to keep pace with Florida, which escaped into the bay. However, Oneida kept up fire on the ship for 29 minutes until it was safely under the protection of Fort Morgan. In addition to the speed issue, the reports state that there were some visibility issues that contributed to poor marksmanship of Oneidas gun crew.

After being reinstated, Preble commanded the sailing sloop , only to have Florida escape him once again, off Madeira.

Writing career
Preble was also known as a writer on naval and historical topics, and as a collector of naval documents. His extensive personal library of books and documents related to the sea are located in The George Henry Preble Collection at the Navy Department Library. He was also active in various learned and genealogical societies of the time. In 1868, he published a genealogical history of the Preble family in North America, which included his biography and portrait, as well as that of his famous uncle, Edward The book also set forth a defense of his actions that led to his dismissal from the Navy, as well as the efforts of himself and others that led to his exoneration and reinstatement. In 1872, he published his History of the American Flag, which is still cited as a source. He also took care of the original "Star-Spangled Banner" which had flown over Fort McHenry, and had the flag sewn to a piece of sailcloth in order to preserve it.

Later life and death
After the war, Preble commanded the steamer , and rescued 600 passengers from the wrecked steamer Golden Rule. He was at the Boston Navy Yard from 1865 to 1868, where he was promoted to captain on March 16, 1867, then commanded the screw steamer  until 1870. He became commodore on November 2, 1871, commanded the Philadelphia Navy Yard from 1873 to 1875, became rear admiral on September 30, 1876, and retired in 1878.

He was a member of the Military Order of the Loyal Legion of the United States.

In 1873 Preble was elected a member of the American Antiquarian Society

Preble died while living near Boston, Massachusetts, on March 1, 1885.   He is buried near his famous uncle in the Eastern Cemetery in Portland, Maine.

Publications
 Chase of the Rebel Steamer of War "Oreto" (Cambridge, 1862)
  A genealogical Sketch of the First Three Generations of Prebles in America (Boston, 1868)
 First Cruise of the United States Frigate "Essex" (Salem, 1870)
 History of the American Flag (Albany, 1872)
 History of Steam Navigation (Philadelphia, 1883)
  History of the Flag of the United States of America (1880)

Notes

References
 
Attribution

External links

 Photograph of Rear Admiral George Henry Preble from the Maine Memory Network
 George Henry Preble Papers, 1858–1869 MS 381 held by Special Collections & Archives, Nimitz Library at the United States Naval Academy
 
 

1816 births
1885 deaths
Union Navy officers
United States Navy personnel of the Mexican–American War
American naval historians
American male non-fiction writers
United States Navy admirals
Writers from Portland, Maine
Vexillologists
Tylden family
Burials at Eastern Cemetery
Members of the American Antiquarian Society